Siloam Springs may refer to:

Siloam Springs, Arkansas
Siloam Springs, Gentry County, Missouri
Siloam Springs, Howell County, Missouri
Siloam Springs Township, Howell County, Missouri

See also
Siloam Springs Cardinals (also known as the Buffaloes and the Travelers), a former minor league baseball team that represented Siloam Springs, Arkansas in the Arkansas–Missouri League and Arkansas State League from 1934–1940
West Siloam Springs, Oklahoma